Minus One are a Cypriot rock band formed in Nicosia in 2009. They gained prominence in 2016 for representing Cyprus in the Eurovision Song Contest.

History
Minus One began as a cover band, but later started performing their own music.

They tried to represent Cyprus in the Eurovision Song Contest 2015 with the song "Shine", but placed third in the national final. After being internally selected, they represented Cyprus in the Eurovision Song Contest 2016 with the song "Alter Ego", which they co-wrote with Swedish musician Thomas G:son. The band reached 8th place with 164 points in the semi-final, and finished in 21st place with 96 points in the final.

As a part of their "Alter Ego Tour" in 2016, the band performed in Amsterdam, Limassol, London, and Moscow.

In February 2017, they opened for British musician Glenn Hughes on his Resonate Tour in Vienna, Bologna, and Milan. On 16 December 2017, the band released a cover of the 1964 song "You Don't Own Me", originally performed by Lesley Gore. In the Minus One version, the band is joined by 15-year-old Cypriot singer Semeli Panayiotou.

Minus One's first album, Red Black White, was released on 14 December 2018. It was recorded at Medley Studios in Copenhagen and released by Danish label Mighty Music.

Band members

Current
 Andreas Kapatais – lead vocals
 Constantinos Amerikanos – guitar, backing vocals
 Harrys Pari – guitar
 Orestis Savva – bass
 Christopher Ioannides – drums

Previous 
 Francois Micheletto – lead vocals
 George Solonos – guitar, backing vocals
 Antonis Loizides – bass
 Maxim Theofanides – bass

Discography

Studio albums 
 Red Black White - 2018
 Got It Covered - 2021

EP 
 The Bologna Season - 2017

Singles 
 Alter Ego - 2016
 The Potato Song - 2016
 Save Me - 2016
 You Don't Own Me - 2017
 Girl - 2018
 What's Up - 2019
 My Girl - Where Did You Sleep Last Night - 2020
 What's Up? - 2021
 Oh Pretty Woman - 2021

References

Cypriot rock music groups
Eurovision Song Contest entrants for Cyprus
Eurovision Song Contest entrants of 2016